Downtown Inglewood station is an at-grade light rail station on the K Line of the Los Angeles Metro Rail system. It is located alongside Florence Avenue between Market and Locust Streets in the central business district of the city of Inglewood, California.

The station opened on October 7, 2022. Metro held a ceremonial ribbon cutting ceremony for the station on September 10, 2022.

The station incorporates artwork by the artist Kenturah Davis.

During the 2028 Summer Olympics, the station will serve spectators traveling to and from venues located in Inglewood including opening and closing ceremonies, soccer games, and  archery at SoFi Stadium, and gymnastics at Kia Forum.

Service

Station layout

Hours and frequency

Connections 
, the following connections are available:
Torrance Transit: 10X 
SoFi Stadium Shuttle

Notable places nearby 
The station is within walking distance of the following notable places:
 Centinela Park, including the Aguaje de Centinela monuments
 Helen Lundeberg’s massive WPA-era History of Transportation petrochrome mosaic mural at Grevillea Art Park
 Inglewood City Hall
 Inglewood Post Office, a WPA Moderne-style building with a New Deal sculpture, Archibald Garner’s “Centinela Springs” mahogany carving, and the bas relief “Buffalo, Bear, Ram, Lion” (Newell & Peticolas) on the exterior, created 1937
 Inglewood Public Library (at Inglewood City Hall), with its substantial collection of framed original children’s book illustrations
 Inglewood Courthouse
 Market Street
 Fox Theatre Inglewood
Downtown Inglewood station and nearby Fairview Heights station are both within walking distance of the following sporting venues:

 Hollywood Park Casino, originally part of Hollywood Park Racetrack (1938–2013), still offers off-track betting on horse races
 Kia Forum, commonly known as the Forum
 SoFi Stadium

People mover 
The Inglewood Transit Connector is a  automated guideway transit line planned to be built by the City of Inglewood. A new elevated station will be constructed nearby and will act as the northern terminus of the line, which will serve a station at the Forum and a station at Hollywood Park (connecting to SoFi Stadium, the Hollywood Park Casino and Intuit Dome).

See also
 Inglewood Depot (1887–~1973)

References 

K Line (Los Angeles Metro) stations
Buildings and structures in Inglewood, California
Railway stations in the United States opened in 2022